Spy for Germany is a 1956 West German thriller film directed by Werner Klingler that stars Martin Held, Nadja Tiller and Walter Giller. Based on a book by Will Berthold, the film depicts the mission of a German spy Erich Gimpel during the Second World War to discover how far the American nuclear programme had progressed. It was shot at the Tempelhof Studios in West Berlin and on location in Boston and New York in America. The film's sets were designed by the art directors Hans Kuhnert and Paul Markwitz.

Plot
In 1944, with defeat imminent, German counter-intelligence is desperate to know how soon the US will have nuclear bombs. Experienced agent Erich Gimpel is assigned the mission, but he says he cannot pass for an American. He is given an immature American defector, Billy Cole, as colleague and the two are dropped from a submarine on the coast. Hiding out in a seedy New York hotel, Gimpel tries to find leads to scientists working on the nuclear programme, but his cover is blown when Cole defects back to the FBI.

After astutely recovering the case with his radio and money that Cole had deposited, he bumps into an old colleague who offers him the use of his empty apartment. This gives him perfect cover to pursue his enquiries, the only flaw being that a key to the apartment has also been given to another friend of the owner. This is Joan Kenneth, an attractive young woman who is setting up a dress shop. She accepts the presence of the mysterious stranger, and begins to fall in love with him.

Gimpel at last gets through to a scientist, who tells him that he is too late as nuclear bombs will very soon be ready to drop on America's enemies. He decides to abandon his mission and defect to South America with the willing Joan. At the airport desk he is arrested and, on being convicted as a spy, sentenced to hang. The death of President Roosevelt imposes a moratorium on executions, so his penalty is commuted to life imprisonment. Joan is ready to wait for him and, when he is released after 11 years, he takes her back to Germany.

Cast
 Martin Held as Erich Gimpel
 Nadja Tiller as Joan Kenneth
 Walter Giller as Billy Cole
 Viktor Staal as Oberst Sommerfeld
 Claude Farell as Inge Hagen
 Gustav Knuth as Roger Bentley
 Heinz Drache as Jim Newman
 Stanislav Ledinek as Mr. Brown
 Martin Kosleck as Griffins
 Günter Pfitzmann as Korvettenkapitän Hilbig
 Ernst Stahl-Nachbaur as Atomprofessor

References

External links

1956 films
1950s spy thriller films
West German films
1950s German-language films
Films directed by Werner Klingler
Films set in 1944
Films set in 1945
Films set in the United States
World War II spy films
Films based on biographies
Films about nuclear war and weapons
German spy thriller films
1950s German films
Films shot in Boston
Films shot in New York City
Films shot at Tempelhof Studios
German black-and-white films
German thriller films